Langalbandh (literally, the place where the plough stopped), is a village in Bangladesh, and a place considered holy by Hindus. It is located in Bandar Upazila of Narayanganj District, on the bank of the Brahmaputra River near the Dhaka-Chittagong highway.

The annual religious bathing ritual in Langalbandh draws thousands of Hindu devotees from Bangladesh and also neighboring India and Nepal.

The 2015 stampede
During the annual mela falling on 27 March over 1.5 million devotees thronged Langalbandh for the ritual bathing. Ten Hindu devotees were killed and 30 others were injured in a stampede during the 'Astami snan', the Hindu holy bathing ritual. The unexpectedly large crowd and the lack of proper preparedness of the authorities are said to have contributed to the fatalities in the stampede.

References

External links
 

Populated places in Dhaka Division
Hinduism in Bangladesh